Khalid Hussain Asad is a two-star general in Pakistan Army, currently serving as the DG Medical Services, Azad Kashmir (DGMS AK). He was promoted to the rank of Major General on 11 February 2014.

References

Pakistani generals
Living people
1958 births